This page list topics related to Christmas Island.



0-9

A
Australia
Australian Indian Ocean Territories

B
Battle of Christmas Island
Birds of Christmas Island

C
Christmas Island District High School
Christmas Island National Park

D
Drumsite

E

F
Flying Fish Cove

G

H

I

J

K

L
List of people on stamps of Australia

M

N

O

P
Poon Saan

Q

R

S
Shire of Christmas Island
Silver City

T

U
Unidentified body on Christmas Island

V

W

X

Y

Z

See also
Lists of country-related topics - similar lists for other countries